Elytroderma is a genus of fungi within the Rhytismataceae family. The genus contains two species.

References

External links
Elytroderma at Index Fungorum

Leotiomycetes